Azerables (Limousin: Drable) is a commune in the Creuse department in the Nouvelle-Aquitaine region in central France.

Geography
The A20 autoroute forms much of the western border of  the commune.

The river Anglin has its source in the commune.

The river Abloux forms most of the commune's eastern border.

Population

Sights
 The church, dating from the twelfth century.
 A fifteenth-century chapel.
 A modern chapel.

See also
Communes of the Creuse department

References

Communes of Creuse